Quentin Gérard John Mosimann (born 14 February 1988 in Geneva) is a Swiss DJ and record producer.
Quentin Mosimann took up his DJ career in the south of France, in Saint-Tropez when he was only 14. At age of 20, he won the French TV reality show Star Academy, and gained success with 2 albums in Universal Music ('Duel' & 'Exhibition') and a tour featuring a show at the famous Olympia of Paris. That was a stairway to his current international career of "DJ Singer".

Biography
Mosimann was born in Geneva on 14 February 1988, to a Swiss father (a native of Bern in German-speaking Switzerland) and a French mother. However, he only had Swiss nationality. He lived in Geneva for three years, then, following the separation of his parents, moved to Bogève, Haute-Savoie, with his mother. He moved to Hyères, Var, near Saint-Tropez in 2005 where he performed, under the pseudonym John Louly, as a DJ at the NJoy club with John Revox and Christian Sims.

Career

2008–09: Star Academy 
Mosimann won the Star Academy on 15 February 2008. He earned 1,000,000 euros, 200,000 of them immediately available. On 18 August 2008 he released his debut album, Duel, a double album, which was No. 2 in France and No. 1 in Belgium (Wallonia). It contains many cover versions of 1980s hits, such as "C'est l'amour", by Léopold Nord & Vous, "Mise au point" by Jakie Quartz and "Étienne" by Guesch Patti.

2010–11: Exhibition 
On 15 February 2010 he released his second album "Exhibition", a pop-electro album which was No. 7 in France, No. 5 in Belgium (Wallonia) and No. 36 in Switzerland. His DJ career took an international dimension in 2010. Since, he has been performing in prestigious clubs around the world, in Europe, the US, Russia, China, Thailand, Polynesia, Indonesia, Israel, Egypt, Korea, Philippines, Morocco, Mozambique, Kazakhstan, Ukraine, Taiwan and many other countries.

2012: The Voice Belgium 
In 2012, in addition to his career as a DJ, he was a judge on The Voice Belgium with Tara McDonald acting as his assistant coach. He collaborated with the contestant he was coaching, Roberto Bellarosa, (who eventually became the winner of The Voice Belgium), on the realization of his first album, 'Ma voie'. On 19 October 2012, he was ranked 74th of the TOP100 ranking British magazine DJ Mag, and became the fifth French best DJ ahead Bob Sinclar or Justice. He won 100 places in the ranking in a year.

2013: Psyké Underground 
In 2013, the theme park Walibi Belgium asked him to make the single "Psyké Underground", which became the theme song for their latest roller coaster, also called Psyké Underground. In September 2013, he became the main weekly resident DJ on the famous French EDM radio Fun Radio. He became the World's No. 69 DJ based on DJ Magazine's annual Top 100 DJs poll in October 2013, fourth French best DJ in the world, and he released his 3rd album 'The 8 Deadly Sins' in DJ Center Records, electro and progressive-house.

2014: Décibels on Stage 
In January 2014, his Party Fun show on air on Fun Radio was ranked No. 1 with 638,000 listeners (an increase of 178,000 listeners 39% in one year) In October 2014, for the third year consecutively, Quentin Mosimann is ranked by the DJ Magazine's annual Top 100 DJs poll. He is currently, ranked #72 worldwide and 4th best French DJ. Since October 2014 he is presenter of the musical TV show Décibels on Stage on channel La Deux, from the Belgian Radio-Television Group (RTBF) public television.

2015: What I Did For Love 
In January 2015, he released his official remix of "What I Did For Love" (David Guetta - ft. Emeli Sande). In April 2015, he released his official remix of "Feel the Vibe" (Sinclar - ft. Dawn Tallman). In August 2015, he signed for a new season as a judge on The Voice Belgium TV show. On 29 August 2015, after two years of weekly show on Party Fun, he decreases to a show a month in order to satisfy his audience in live without sacrificing his international career that keeps on growing. On 15 June 2015 the release of 'Jetlag' on the label Change Your Mind Records was executed. On 26 June 2015, the release of Igor Blaska feat Yvan Franel - 'City Of Love' (Quentin Mosimann Remix) was executed. On 10 December 2015, the release of Rollon - Run Away (Quentin Mosimann Remix) was executed.

2016: Releases 
On 28 March 2016 'I'm Leaving', in collaboration with Tom Swoon & Ilang on the label Armada / Zouk Recordings, was released. On 15 April 2016, the release of 'TI89' on the label Run DBN was executed. On 16 May 2016, the release of 'Somebody call the cops' in collaboration with DJs From Mars on the label Big Fish was executed. In March 2016, he was elected Best DJ Performer of 2015 by  before David Guetta & DJ Snake. In June 2016, release of 'The Gifted One' in collaboration with Uhre on the label GL Music was executed. In July 2016, release of 'GOOF' on the label Big & Dirty was executed.

2017: More releases 
In February 2017, release of 'Never Let You Go' on the label Warner/Parlophone was executed.

Discography

Studio albums

Official remixes 
 City Of Love - Igor Blaska feat Yvan Franel
 Feel the vibe - Bob Sinclar - ft. Dawn Tallman
 What I Did For Love - David Guetta feat. Emili Sandé
 Back 2 Paradise – Guéna LG & Amir Afargan feat. Sophie Ellis-Bextor 
 Wildfire – Julian Perretta 
 Leh Leh Leh – Igor Blaska & Vkee Madison 
 Alright – Mark Knight feat. Sway 	
 Nevert Say Kukatu (Hardwell & Dyro vs Ivan Gough & Jebu)
 SOS (Ocean Drive)
 Fix of you (Tara McDonald)
 Timeless (Vince M)
 Summer All Over (Chris Kaeser feat. Ron Carroll) 
 Love Again (Laurent Wolf) 
 Si Mes Larmes Tombent (Christophe Willem) 
 Ma'ak Bartaah (Amr Dian)
 Psychopath (Fred Pellichero) 
 On Les Aime (Gary Fico)
 Dance (Sir Colin)
 Love at First Sight (Jay Style feat. John Louly)
 Acid Killer (Christian Sims) 
 Respect (RLP feat. Barbara Tucker) 
 Be My Candy (Téo Moss) 
 Do You St-Tropez? (Quentin Mosimann cover) 
 Mario vs Angello (Ricksick) 
 I Love U (David Vendetta) 
 Over You (Mehrbod) 
 I Wanna Take You Away (Ben DJ) 
 Electrochoc (Samomike) 
 The Orange Theme (Hatiras)
 Crazy (Eva Pearl feat. Humphrey) 
 Starlove (Christian Sims)
 Shame on You (Valentin Florian)
 Superstar (JC Magnetic)
 Take A Look (Julien Créance)
 Feel Alone (Alan Pride & Jeremy Kalls)
 Gimme A Break (Quentin Mosimann)
 Get Up (Alexis Dante & Sicky feat. Eva Menson)
 Big Orgus (DJ Furax)
 Love Is The Solution (Alexandre Billard)
 My Love Is Over (Jean-Roch)
 Le Cirque (Chris Garcia)

Vocal covers 
 Melody - Oliver Heldens
 Back in Time – Don Diablo
 Payback – Dimitri Vangelis & Wyman X Steve Angello
 Drunk – Kitsch 2.0 & Ken Roll
 Get loose – Showtek & Noisecontrollers (Tiesto remix)
 Hook – Joachim Garraud & Alesia
 Heart Upon my Sleeve – Avicii 
 Hell Yeah – Tiesto & Showtek 
 Lrad – Knife Party
 Eagles – Sander Van Doorn & Adrian Lux

Involvement 
 2007 : Peace & Love 70 par Star Academy 7 (Bangladesh)
 2009 : Scratch Da House Showbizz en collaboration avec Sir Colin
 2012 : Ma voie par Roberto Bellarosa
 2012 : Je reprends ma route – charity in favor of the organisation: Les voix de l'enfant

Singles 
As John Louly (before 2007):
 "Hot Vocation" (Hot Vocation)
 "Tears" (Hot Vocation)
 "Holiday" (Hot Vocation)
 "My Answer" (Hot Vocation) – jamais sorti
 "Stop in My Mind" (Hot Vocation) – jamais sorti
 "Love at First Sight" (Jay Style feat. John Louly) – album Dancefloor Selection by Jay Style

As Quentin Mosimann (after 2007):

Podcasts 
Every month, Quentin Mosimann publishes free podcasts on iTunes : House Bless You By Mosimann, his mixes (Progressive-House sound/
EDM) are also available on Fun Radio.

References
Citations

Sources
 Quentin Mosimann, discography and peak positions in Belgium (Wallonia)
 Quentin Mosimann, discography and peak positions in France

External links

 

1988 births
French DJs
Living people
Musicians from Geneva
Swiss people of French descent
English-language singers from Switzerland
French-language singers of Switzerland
Star Academy winners
Star Academy (France) participants
Swiss DJs
21st-century Swiss  male singers